The 2021–22 season is Crawley Town's 126th year in their history and seventh consecutive season in League Two. Along with the league, the club will also compete in the FA Cup, the EFL Cup and the EFL Trophy. The season covers the period from 1 July 2021 to 30 June 2022.

Background and pre-season

Pre-season
Crawley Town announced their would play friendly matches against Walton Casuals, Horley Town, Burgess Hill Town, Three Bridges, Horsham, Southampton U23s, East Grinstead Town, West Ham United U23, Tottenham Hotspur U23 and Beckenham Town as part of their pre-season preparations. However, the scheduled fixture against Southampton U23s was later confirmed as cancelled.

Review

August
Crawley's first match was away to the previous season's National League play-off winners, Hartlepool United which they lost 1–0 after a late winner from Gavan Holohan. The club then faced League One side Gillingham in the first round of the EFL Cup and the away side went ahead in the 3rd minute after Gerald Sithole scored in "controversial circumstances". Crawley equalised in the 55th minute when Sam Ashford tapped in from close range and after a Daniel Phillips volley put the visitors ahead for the second time in stoppage time, Archie Davies equalised for the hosts on the 90+7th minute to take the match to a penalty shoot-out. Crawley lost 10–9 in the penalty shoot-out, with Crawley scoring their first nine penalties of the shoot-out before a miss from Ludwig Francillette. The match against Harrogate Town on 14 August 2021 was postponed due positive cases of COVID-19 within the Harrogate Town squad.

Competitions

League Two

League table

Matches
Crawley Town's fixtures were released on 24 June 2021.

FA Cup

Crawley were drawn at home to Tranmere Rovers in the first round.

EFL Cup

Crawley were drawn at home to Gillingham in the first round.

EFL Trophy

Transfers

Transfers in

Loans in

Transfers out

Loans out

Appearances and goals
Source:
Numbers in parentheses denote appearances as substitute.
Players with names struck through and marked  left the club during the playing season.
Players with names in italics and marked * were on loan from another club for the whole of their season with Crawley.
Key to positions: GK – Goalkeeper; DF – Defender; MF – Midfielder; FW – Forward

Notes

References

Crawley Town
Crawley Town F.C. seasons